Eriocraniella is a genus of moth of the family Eriocraniidae.

Species
Subgenus Eriocraniella
Eriocraniella aurosparsella
Eriocraniella longifurcula
Eriocraniella mediabulla
Eriocraniella platyptera
Eriocraniella xanthocara
Subgenus Disfurcula Davis, 1978
Eriocraniella variegata
Eriocraniella trigona	
Eriocraniella falcata

References

Eriocraniidae
Moth genera
Glossata genera